Olivaichthys is a genus of velvet catfishes endemic to Argentina.

Recently several authors have synonymized this genus with Diplomystes. A molecular analysis has proposed that trans-Andean Diplomystes and the cis-Andean Olivaichthys are so closely related (in addition to the close morphological similarity), that Olivaichthys should not be recognized. However, this is strange as recent divergence is unlikely with the species on either side of the Andes.

Species
 Olivaichthys cuyanus (Ringuelet, 1965)
 Olivaichthys mesembrinus (Ringuelet, 1982)
 Olivaichthys viedmensis (MacDonagh, 1931) (Otuno)

References
 

 

Endemic fauna of Argentina
Catfish genera
Freshwater fish genera